P. K. Sreemathy (born 4 May 1949), popularly known as P. K. Sreemathy Teacher, is an Indian politician and a member of the Communist Party of India (Marxist). Born at Mayyil Panchayat in Kannur district, Sreemathy was elected to the Kerala Legislative Assembly in 2001 and 2006 from Payyanur constituency. She was the Health and Family Welfare Minister of Kerala from 2006 to 2011. She was member of 16th Lok Sabha, representing Kannur constituency.

Biography 
Sreemathy teacher is a politician in Kerala politics. She was born on 4 May 1949 as the daughter of Kelu Nambiar and P. K. Meenakshi Amma.

She was the Kannur District Council standing committee chairperson for some time before she became the Kannur district Panchayat from 1995 to 1997. Now she is All India Democratic Women's Association State secretary and CPI(M) National Committee Member. She was elected to the Kerala Legislative Assembly in 2001 and 2006 from Payyanur constituency. She won the 2014 Lok Sabha election from Kannur constituency, defeating Indian National Congress's K. Sudhakaran by a margin of 6566 votes. She lost to K. Sudhakaran of UDF with a margin of 94,559 votes in 2019 Indian General election.

Positions held

 Standing Committee Chairman, Kannur District Panchayat.
 President, Kannur District Panchayat.
 State Secretary, All India Democratic Women's Association
 CPI (M), National Committee Member.
 Minister for Health and Family Welfare, Government of Kerala, Achuthanandan ministry
 Parliament Member  from Kannur Lok Sabha constituency
Member, Committee on Empowerment of Women
Retired Head Teacher
Member, Standing Committee on Human Resource Development
Member, Consultative Committee, Ministry of Health and Family Welfare
Member, Silk Board

See also 
 Kerala Council of Ministers

References

Malayali politicians
People from Kannur district
1949 births
Living people
India MPs 2014–2019
Lok Sabha members from Kerala
Communist Party of India (Marxist) politicians from Kerala
Kerala MLAs 2001–2006
21st-century Indian women politicians
21st-century Indian politicians
Women members of the Kerala Legislative Assembly